, prov. designation: , is a centaur and damocloid on a retrograde and  eccentric orbit from the outer region of the Solar System. It was first observed on 12 June 1999, by astronomers with the LINEAR program at the Lincoln Lab's ETS near Socorro, New Mexico, in the United States.

Description 

 orbits the Sun at a distance of 4.3–11.9 AU once every 23 years and 2 months (8,462 days; semi-major axis of 8.13 AU). Its orbit has an eccentricity of 0.47 and an inclination of 152° with respect to the ecliptic.

It spends most of its orbit located in the outer Solar System between Jupiter and Uranus, and like all centaurs, has an unstable orbit caused by the gravitational influence of the giant planets. Due to this, it must have originated from elsewhere, most likely outside Neptune. It is both a Jupiter and Saturn-crossing minor planet. Of over half a million known minor planets,  is one of about 60 that has a retrograde orbit.

 is approximately 16.8 km in diameter. It came to perihelion (closest approach to the Sun) in December 1998. It was last observed in 2000, and will next come to perihelion in February 2022.

Observations 
This asteroid has been recorded at such observatories as:
 Lincoln Laboratory (1.0-m f/2.15 reflector + CCD) - location of discovery
 Dominion Astrophysical Observatory (1.82-m reflector + CCD)
 Dynic Astronomical Observatory (0.60-m f/3.7 reflector + CCD)
 European Northern Observatory (1.0-m reflector + CCD)
 Farpoint (0.30-m Schmidt-Cassegrain + CCD)
 Kleť Observatory (0.57-m f/5.2 reflector + CCD)
 McDonald Observatory (0.76-m reflector + CCD)
 Roque de los Muchachos Observatory (1.0-m reflector + CCD)

See also 
 20461 Dioretsa a.k.a. 1999 LD31
 
 List of exceptional asteroids

References

External links 
 MPEC 1999-M29 : 1999 LE31, Minor Planet Electronic Circular, Minor Planet Center
 Yanga R. Fernández, David C. Jewitt, and Scott S. Sheppard, Low Albedos Among Extinct Comet Candidates, May 22, 2001
 BAA Comet Section Comets of 1999, Ast.cam.ac.uk
 1999 LE31 – Seiichi Yoshida @ aerith.net
 Asteroid 1999 LE31, Small Body Data Ferret
 
 

612093
612093
612093
612093
Minor planets with a retrograde orbit
19990612